Booker Taliaferro Robinson was an American baseball third baseman in the Negro leagues. He played with the Atlanta Black Crackers and the Newark Eagles in 1944.

References

External links
 and [https://www.seamheads.com/NegroLgs/player.php?playerID=robin01boo Seamheads

Year of birth missing
Year of death missing
Atlanta Black Crackers players
Newark Eagles players]
Baseball third basemen